The Exploradores Glacier is a glacier situated on the northeastern slope of Monte San Valentín, in the Aysén del General Carlos Ibáñez del Campo Region of Chile. The locality nearest to the glacier is Puerto Río Tranquilo, which is located on the western shore of General Carrera Lake.

The glacier is part of Laguna San Rafael National Park.

References

Glaciers of Aysén Region